Memorial Park, also known as Trust House Memorial Park for sponsorship reasons and formerly as Cameron and Soldiers' Park, is a sports facility which is located in Masterton, Wellington region, New Zealand. The two main sports that are played on the ground are Rugby and Football. It has a capacity for 10,000 spectators.

It is the home ground of Heartland Championship side Wairarapa Bush Rugby Football Union.

History

The previous Masterton showground was acquired by a local committee in 1918. Brothers Donald and Robert Cameron acquired the land for Memorial Park and the park commemorated their last name and their father and uncle Lieutenant Norman Cameron, killed at Gallipoli.

The grandstand was blown by a storm in 1934, and during the Second World War the grounds were used by the New Zealand Army.

In 2008 the park was renamed Trust House Memorial Park for sponsorship reasons. In 2015 at the cost of NZ $2.1 million the park was renovated to add a turf ground, stadium lighting and redesigned fence lines and footpaths.

Tenants
Rugby union team Wairarapa Bush uses Memorial Park for all its home games. It has also been the home ground on some occasions for the Hurricanes Development team.

In association football, Wairarapa United use the home ground for their home games. Wairarapa United won the Chatham Cup, New Zealand's most coveted football trophy, in 2011.

See also

Wairarapa Bush Rugby Football Union
Heartland Championship

References

External links
Official website of the Wairarapa Bush Rugby Football Union

Rugby union stadiums in New Zealand
Sport in Masterton
Buildings and structures in the Wairarapa
Sports venues in the Wellington Region